Chas Smith (AKA Charles Vincent Smith) (1957 - 2007) was an author, musician, radio personality, and a Cleveland State University music instructor.

Biography
Smith taught and explored the cultural aspects of American Roots music for over twenty years. He held both a Bachelor’s and a master's degree in music from Cleveland State University, where he offered “The Roots of Rock and Soul”, a class on American rock music and its roots, and he taught basic music composition to little kids through a program with the Cleveland Opera as a music mentor in grade schools.

Smith sang and played keyboards, bass guitar, and theremin for over 30 years in many different genres. He was in The Clocks (AKA Radio Alarm Clocks), a popular Cleveland punk band in the late 1970s and early '80s, then he was keyboardist for the latter-day version of  The Pagans. In 1993 he formed the band Einstein's Secret Orchestra (later called Einstein's Secret Outlaws), voted Best Electronic/Instrumental Band at the Cleveland Free Times Music Awards in 2001, and produced two CDs of ESO's music, with others produced by the SubGenius Foundation. He also toured with Cobra Verde as keyboardist from 1997 through the early 2000s, and played with the country-blues Americana band The Fullbrights.

He and the band ESO often appeared on stage with Rev. Ivan Stang of the Church of the SubGenius, and perform on several of their CDs and DVDs. He spent over 20 years creating soundscapes on his weekly SwampRadio ESO radio show at WCSB in Cleveland. He performed live on-the-air comedy with Brain Rot Theater on Swamp Radio, and with Rev. Ivan Stang and the cast of The Hour of Slack, the Church of the SubGenius syndicated radio show. He was a board member of A.C.E. and appeared at both the Starwood Festival and the WinterStar Symposium, offering both performances and classes on music history and electronic trance music, and hosted a dance event within the Starwood Festival called the "Rumble in the Jungle".

Smith died on October 16, 2007, after suffering a stroke complicated with pneumonia, and fighting a recurrent battle with Hodgkin's lymphoma due to complications from the HIV virus, eventually leading to auto immune deficiency syndrome.

On Friday November 23, 2007 a tribute event called Chasfest: The Rumble in the Urban Jungle was held at the Beachland Ballroom in his honor. All proceeds went to his family to help defray medical bills. Feature performers included Cobra Verde, 14th Floor, Stardust Outlaws, The Fullbrights, Caelyn, the surviving members of Einstein's Secret Orchestra (including members from past incarnations of the group and Ron Slabe), a set by combined members of the bands The Pagans, The Clocks, and Venus Envy, a drum circle that included several members of the Association for Consciousness Exploration (who also contributed to the audio and provided video projection created by Rev. Ivan Stang of the Church of the SubGenius for the event), and a special guest appearance by Egyptian composer Halim El-Dabh.

Bibliography
From Woodstock to the Moon: The Cultural Evolution of Rock Music (2001 Kendall-Hunt Publishing) ,  
The Soul of Sunrise: Grassroots Music in America (2005 Kendall-Hunt Publishing) , 
Rumble in the Jungle: The Soul of Indigenous Music in the Americas (2007 Kendall-Hunt Publishing) ,

Discography

Albums
 The Pagans (the pink album) (1983) Terminal TERM - 7 (reissued in 1988 by Treehouse) (LP)
 Wake Me When It's Over - Radio Alarm Clocks (1983) After Hours Records (LP)
 Venus Envy - Venus Envy (1985) Herb Jackson Records
 Live From Studio "A" - The Clocks
 Circus Saints and Sinners - Fourteenth Floor - Synthetic Records
 XX-Day '99 - Rev. Ivan Stang & Einstein's Secret Orchestra (1999) SubGenius Foundation
 PufferDome Devival - Rev. Ivan Stang & Einstein's Secret Orchestra (1999) SubGenius Foundation
 Witch Disco - Einstein's Secret Orchestra (1999) SwampRadio Records
 Nightlife - Cobra Verde (1999) Motel
 Sex in Another Dimension - Einstein's Secret Orchestra (2000) Swamp Music Records
 ESO Swamp Radio / Hour of Slack Best of #1 - Rev. Ivan Stang, Chas Smith & Lonesome Cowboy Dave DeLuca (2001) SubGenius Foundation

Video
 X-Day 1998 - Einstein's Secret Orchestra (1998) (VHS) SubGenius Foundation
 XX-Day '99 - Rev. Ivan Stang & Einstein's Secret Orchestra (1999) (VHS) SubGenius Foundation
 5 X-Day - Einstein's Secret Outlaws (2002) (DVD) SubGenius Foundation

References

 Pictures of Chas Smith on SubGenius Website
 Huff, John 12 Simple Rules for a Successful College Career - The Cleveland Stater
 O'Connor, Clint Meet Prof. Rock - The Plain Dealer July 2, 2002

1957 births
2007 deaths
American SubGenii
Musicians from Cleveland
Deaths from pneumonia in Ohio